Grand Ayatollah Jafar Sobhani (born 9 April 1929 in Tabriz) is an Iranian Twelver Shia marja, influential theologian and writer. Sobhani was a former member of the Society of Seminary Teachers of Qom and founder of Imam Sadiq Institute in Qom.

Education   
Ja'far Sobhani learned Arabic literature, Principles of Islamic jurisprudence in the Islamic Seminary. In 1946, he went to Islamic Seminary in Qom. In the Islamic Seminary, he took part in famous teachers' classes of Fiqh, Usool, Tafsir, and philosophy. Sobhani's important teachers were Seyyed Hossein Borujerdi, Khomeini, and Mirza Sayyed Mohammad Tabatabai near 15 years.

Activities 
 Qom Islamic Seminary's lecturer and scholar in Fiqh, Principles of Fiqh, history, and theological studies 
 Founder and director of Maktabe Islam magazine 
 Founder and director of Kalaame Islami magazine 
 Established  an institute for theological research known as Imam Sadiq Institute  
 Participated in writing the Constitution of the Islamic Republic of Iran 
 Writer of a thematic interpretation of the Quran  
 Fighting with Wahhabism 
 Established the field of Ilm al-Kalam in the seminary of Qom
 Published more than 300 researches

Books
He has several Arabic and Persian books that are categorized in seven fields as Fiqh, Principles of Islamic jurisprudence, Tafsir, Ilm al-Kalam, Philosophy, History of Islam, and Biographical evaluation. In 2001, Doctrines of Shi'i Islam: A Compendium of Imami Beliefs and Practices book was translated into English and published by I. B. Tauris.
Some of his books include:

References

1929 births
Living people
People from Tabriz
Society of Seminary Teachers of Qom members
Members of the Assembly of Experts for Constitution
Muslim People's Republic Party politicians
Recipients of the Order of Knowledge
Iran's Book of the Year Awards recipients